Gragg House is a historic home located near Blowing Rock, Watauga County, North Carolina.  It dates to the mid-19th century, and is a one-story, log dwelling.  It has a saddle bag plan and features a central stone chimney.  It has a two-room later addition which gives the house an "L"-shaped plan.

It was listed on the National Register of Historic Places in 1973.

References

Log houses in the United States
Houses on the National Register of Historic Places in North Carolina
Houses in Watauga County, North Carolina
National Register of Historic Places in Watauga County, North Carolina
Log buildings and structures on the National Register of Historic Places in North Carolina